Hell on Church Street is the sixth studio album by the American group Punch Brothers, released on January 14, 2022. The band announced the release of the album's first single "Church Street Blues" on September 28, 2021. The album was self-produced by the band and was released on the Nonesuch Records label.

The album is a re-imagining of Tony Rice's 1983 album Church Street Blues and is described by the band as "its own work of art and a gift to Rice." that the Wall Street Journal describes as a "cheeky show of respect" and "nicely unpredictable."

The eleven songs were recorded in Blackbird Studio in Nashville, TN in November 2020.

Production history 
Prior to joining Punch Brothers, guitarist Chris Eldridge studied with guitarist Tony Rice at Oberlin Conservatory in Winter 2003 before graduating in 2004. Rice, inducted into the International Bluegrass Music Hall of Fame in 2013, was a stated inspiration to Chris Thile and Punch Brothers.

After the release of their 2018 album All Ashore and its 2019 win for Grammy Award for Best Folk Album at the 61st Grammy Awards, Punch Brothers covered the entirety of Church Street Blues at the RockyGrass Festival in Lyons, CO on July 28, 2019. After cancelling their 2020 tour due to the COVID-19 pandemic the band met in Nashville, Tennessee in November 2020 to record their interpretation of Church Street Blues in its entirety, at suggestion of banjoist Noam Pikelny. Prior to the recording the band did not listen to the original versions of the songs that Rice had played, to focus on their own version instead of trying to capture the spirit of the original.

The band planned to surprise Rice with the completed album but he died before production was complete.

Track listing

Personnel 
 Chris Thile – lead vocals, mandolin
 Noam Pikelny – banjo
 Chris Eldridge – acoustic guitar
 Paul Kowert – bass
 Gabe Witcher – fiddle

Charts

References 

2022 albums
Nonesuch Records albums
Punch Brothers albums